Club Atlético Colegiales is an Argentine football club based in Florida Oeste, Buenos Aires. The squad plays in Primera B Metropolitana, the regionalised third division of the Argentine football league system.

History

The beginning
The club was founded on 1 April 1908, in Buenos Aires by a group of anarchists who discussed fighting for better conditions for the working class. That was the reason that originated its first name, "Club Atlético Libertarios Unidos", naming José Garrone as its first president. The colors adopted were red with a horizontal black stripe paying tribute to their anarchist ideology.

Libertarios Unidos' first field was placed just beside the Defensores de Belgrano stadium, in the corner of Blandengues and Manzanares streets of Buenos Aires. Libertarios Unidos was soon forced to change its name, because the government had prohibited any anarchist expression (some sources state that it was the Police Chief Ramón Falcón himself who obliged them to change the name). So the club was renamed as Sportivo del Norte in 1919.

1920 decade
Sportivo del Norte obtained the promotion to Primera B in 1919 and one year later the team was playing its first match in Primera División, where it finished 8th. In 1924 Sportivo had to leave its field in Blandengues and Manzanares, moving to Colegiales district. The club soon renamed honoring its new home, changing not only its name to "Club Atlético Colegiales" (in 1925) but its uniform colors, which became blue, red and gold. They have remained the club colors up to present days.

In 1926 Colegiales registered to dissident body, Asociación Amateurs de Football (AAmF) where the team made a good campaign with a squad nicknamed "Los Fenómenos (The Phenomenons)" due to the skilled players that formed it. Most frequently line-up was: Tauzlet; Rossi, Tachini; Del Corro, Machiavello, Alberico; Martínez, Toscano, Giudice, Granara Costa, Paduano.

Nevertheless, when both leagues merged at the end of the 1926 season, six AAmF teams were disaffiliated (with Colegiales among them) and all their matches annulled. As a result, those clubs were sent to the second division, named "Primera División-Sección B".

In 1928 Colegiales won the second division championship promoting to Primera División. The line-up was: Santiago Sesana; Rossi, Silva; Del Corro, Pausini, Felipelli; Martínez, Toscano, Giudice, González, Coviello.

1930–56

Colegiales had a poor campaign in 1930 and was relegated to Liga Amateur, where the team finished 2nd (after Sportivo Barracas in 1932. Some restructuring in Argentine football relegated Colegiales to the second division. By then the club had moved again, establishing its new home in Fraga and Estomba streets and soon after the club moved to Villa Martelli.

In 1944 Colegiales was relegated to the third division (now Primera C). After two consecutive seasons finishing 2nd, the team finally won the 1947 championship. The team went through the season unbeaten, with 77 goals scored (an average of 3 per game) and only 23 goals conceded. During that year Colegiales played its home games in different venues so the club had forced to move from Villa Martelli. The champion line-up was: Incardona; A. Dardenne, Arrillaga; F. Baloira, Auad, Céspedes; Coudannes, A. Baloira, Cantamessi, Archero, E. Dardenne.

In 1948 the club moved to its current sports field of Antonio Malaver and Gervasio Posadas streets in Florida Oeste, Buenos Aires. A new restructuring in Argentine football relegated Colegiales to a lower division, until 6 January 1956, when the squad won another title when defeated Los Andes 1–0. Coached by Guido Ugobono, the line-up for that match was: Negri; Álvarez, Cosentino; Pérez, Aragón, Cappano; Fassani, Morales, López, Tognola, Vecino (who scored the goal). But Colegiales only lasted one season in Primera B, so the team was relegated again in 1956.

1957–present

Colegiales returned to Primera B after winning the 1992–93 title, defeating Argentino de Quilmes 1–0 in the last game. The team was coached by Rubén Moreno. Colegiales only lasted one season so in 1994 the team was relegated to Primera C again although Cole would return a year later, after winning the Torneo Reducido. Colegiales remained in the division until the team was relegated to Primera C in 2001.

In 2002 the team reached the finals to promote to the upper division but was defeated by Deportivo Laferrere. The next year Colegiales finally got the promotion after beating Villa Dálmine, although the club was punished by the riot caused by its supporters in a match against Tigre. The Argentine Football Association punished Colegiales deducting 9 points to the team, therefore it was relegated to a lower division at the end of the season.

In 2008 Colegiales promoted to Primera B when beating Justo José de Urquiza. Colegiales made a great campaign in that division, reaching the finals against Deportivo Merlo (which finally promoted to Primera B Nacional). In 2011 Colegiales took part in the relaunched Copa Argentina (which had not been played since 1931) being defeated by Independiente 4–0 in the first stage.

Colors and uniform 

The first team jersey was red with a black stripe, taking the colors that identified the anarchistic movement. In 1924, the current three-colored uniform of blue, red and yellow was finally adopted and this combination has remained until now.

Stadium

The club currently plays at "Libertarios Unidos" stadium, sited in Antonio Malaver and Gervasio Posadas streets in Florida Oeste, Buenos Aires, since 1948. As time went by, Colegiales played its home games in diverse stadiums, most of them situated in the city of Buenos Aires: the first in Blandengues y Manzanares streets (1908), then in Teodoro García and Giribone streets in Colegiales neighbourhood (1924), and the last in Fraga and Estomba streets (1941). In 1948 Colegiales moved to Villa Martelli, Vicente López Partido, where hosted a brief time previously to the move to Florida Oeste where the club has remained since then.

After Colegiales promoted to Primera B Metro in 1993, the club built its first and only seated grandstands with capacity for 500 people. In 2005 the stadium increased its capacity to 8,500 after a new grandstand was built, naming it "Tribuna Libertarios Unidos".

Players

Current squad

Honours
Primera B (1): 1928
Primera C (7): 1913, 1914, 1947, 1955, 1992–93, 2002–03, 2007–08

References

External links

 
 El Tricolor Online (outdated blog)

Association football clubs established in 1908
Football clubs in Buenos Aires Province
1908 establishments in Argentina